American Gramaphone is an American record company based in Omaha, Nebraska. It is best known for releasing Chip Davis' new age solo and Mannheim Steamroller albums.

History
American Gramaphone was formed in 1974 by Chip Davis.

American Gramaphone is also a music publisher affiliated with SESAC, publishing all of Davis' compositions (including his work with Bill Fries (C. W. McCall)).

American Gramaphone has also released solo albums by Mannheim Steamroller musicians Jackson Berkey and Ron Cooley, as well as by the bands Checkfield and America.

Albums

See also
 Music in Omaha, Nebraska
 List of record labels

References

Companies based in Omaha, Nebraska
American record labels
Record labels established in 1974
Music of Omaha, Nebraska
New-age music record labels